Union City is located in Obion County, Tennessee, United States. The 2020 census reported the population of the town as 11,170. It is the principal urban settlement of the surrounding micropolitan area, which includes Obion County and Fulton County, Kentucky. Union City is home to Discovery Park of America which is a world-renowned encyclopedic museum with many exhibits pertaining to local history, as well as state, national, and world history, science, technology, and art.

Etymology 
In 1852 General George Gibbs, gave Union City its name because of its location at the junction or "union" of two railroads; the Nashville/Northwestern Railroad (Hickman, KY) and the Mobile, Alabama/Ohio Railroad.

Geography
Union City is located at  (36.424395, −89.050850). The mayor, appointed by his fellow city councilors since 1988, is Terry Hailey.

Climate

Demographics

2020 census

As of the 2020 United States census, there were 11,170 people, 4,461 households, and 2,617 families residing in the city.

2000 census
The racial makeup of the city was 75.44% White, 21.29% African American, 0.22% Native American, 0.29% Asian, 0.13% Pacific Islander, 1.59% from other races, and 1.04% from two or more races. Hispanic or Latino of any race were 3.41% of the population.

There were 4,568 households, out of which 29.7% had children under the age of 18 living with them, 44.6% were married couples living together, 15.1% had a female householder with no husband present, and 36.4% were non-families. 32.7% of all households were made up of individuals, and 15.1% had someone living alone who was 65 years of age or older. The average household size was 2.30 and the average family size was 2.89.

In the city, the population was spread out, with 23.6% under the age of 18, 9.6% from 18 to 24, 26.8% from 25 to 44, 22.6% from 45 to 64, and 17.5% who were 65 years of age or older. The median age was 38 years. For every hundred females there were 87.6 males. For every 100 females age 18 and over, there were 81.4 males.

The median income for a household in the city was $29,399, and the median income for a family was $40,737. Males had a median income of $35,801 versus $19,694 for females. The per capita income for the city was $18,787. About 12.5% of families and 16.8% of the population were below the poverty line, including 26.4% of those under age 18 and 14.6% of those age 65 or over.

Economy
The Goodyear Tire & Rubber Company operated a plant in the city from 1969 to 2011.  On February 10, 2011, Goodyear announced that the Union City plant would shut down by the end of the year. On June 11, 2011, production ceased at the plant.

Darling International operates a rendering plant.

Cultural

Museums 
Union City is home to Discovery Park of America, a 50-acre museum and heritage park with exhibits pertaining to local and national history, nature, military history, art and science. Discovery Park was founded by local businessman Robert Kirkland in order to give back to his home community.

Sports
Union City was home to a Minor League Baseball team known as the Union City Greyhounds from 1935 to 1942 and 1946 to 1952 and as the Union City Dodgers from 1953 to 1955.
 They played in the Kentucky–Illinois–Tennessee League and won three league championships (1936, 1948, and 1954). Over their 19-year run, the team had affiliations with the St. Louis Cardinals, Cincinnati Reds, Cleveland Indians, and Brooklyn Dodgers.

Media
Union City is served by the newspaper The Messenger (Union City Daily Messenger),.

Historic landmarks
Masquerade Theatre - located in the former Capital Theater on South First Street. The theatre is a historic landmark and has been standing since the early 1900s.
Confederate Monument

Notable people

 Russell Dickerson – country music singer
 Steve Finley – MLB outfielder, World Series champion with Arizona Diamondbacks
 Bruce Fleisher (1948–2021) – professional golfer
 Milton H. Hamilton Jr. – served in the Tennessee General Assembly; was majority leader of the Tennessee State Senate
 Andrieus A. Jones – US Senator of New Mexico 1917–1927, born in Union City
 Jovante Moffatt – NFL Player
 Jon Robinson – General Manager, Tennessee Titans
 Derrick Turnbow – MLB pitcher
 Koko B. Ware – professional wrestler
 Zach Underwood – professional fighter

References

Further reading
 History of Obion County, assembled and edited by E.H. Marshall, 1941

External links
 Union City, official website

Cities in Obion County, Tennessee
Cities in Tennessee
County seats in Tennessee
Union City, Tennessee micropolitan area
1867 establishments in Tennessee